The Ozarks is a highland region in the central United States.

Ozark may also refer to:

Places
 Ozark, Alabama
 Ozark, Arkansas
 Ozark, Illinois
 Ozark, Kentucky
 Ozark, Missouri
 Lake Ozark, Missouri, not to be confused with Lake of the Ozarks the nearby body of water for which the city was named.
 Ozark County, Missouri
 Ozark Highlands AVA, an American Viticultural Area in Missouri
 Ozark Mountain AVA, an American Viticultural Area in Arkansas, Missouri, and Oklahoma
 Lake of the Ozarks, Missouri
 Lake of the Ozarks State Park
 Ozark Township (disambiguation)
 Ozark Trail (disambiguation)
 Ozark-St. Francis National Forest is a United States National Forest located in Arkansas
 Current River (Ozarks), the Ozark National Scenic Riverways, the first US national park
 Henry Shaw Ozark Corridor (from 1994) preserves Ozark foothills along Interstate 44
 List of Missouri conservation areas – Ozark region

People
 Ozark Henry, a Belgian musician
 Ozark Ripley, an American fisherman and huntsman
 Danny Ozark, an American baseball manager

Arts, entertainment, and media
 The Ozark Mountain Daredevils, a band formed in 1972 in Springfield, Missouri
 "Ozark", second track on the album As Falls Wichita, So Falls Wichita Falls by Pat Metheny and Lyle Mays
 Ozark Music Festival, a rock music festival that took place in 1974 in Sedalia, Missouri
 Ozark (TV series), an American crime drama web television series

Other uses
 Ozark Air Lines, a defunct airline in the United States
 Ozark Division, a nickname of the U.S. 102nd Infantry Division
 Ozark FC, an amateur association football team
 Ozark High School (disambiguation)
 USS Ozark (disambiguation), several ships of the US Navy

See also
 Tradescantia ozarkana, the Ozark spider wort, native to States of Missouri, Arkansas